The Preston House, also known as the Palmer House, was a historic home located at Saltville, Smyth County, Virginia. The original section was built about 1795. It was a two-story, gable-roofed, double-pile frame structure covered with beaded weatherboard. It consisted of a two-story, five bay center section flanked by later, and lower, two-story, three bay flanking wings. The house was built by lawyer and politician Francis Preston (1765–1836), whose family owned the salt works. The house was destroyed in 1978.

It was listed on the National Register of Historic Places in 1976.

References

Houses on the National Register of Historic Places in Virginia
Federal architecture in Virginia
Greek Revival houses in Virginia
Houses completed in 1842
Houses in Smyth County, Virginia
National Register of Historic Places in Smyth County, Virginia
Preston family of Virginia